Elisabeth Büchsel (1867–1957) was a German painter known for her Impressionist portraits and landscapes.

Biography
Büchsel was born on 29 January 1867 in Stralsund, Germany. She studied in Berlin, Paris, and Munich. Her teachers included Lucien Simon and Christian Landenberger. She spent summers on the island of Hiddensee. She died on 3 July 1957 in Stralsund.

References

External links
images of Büchsel's work on Artnet

 
1867 births
1930 deaths 
20th-century German women artists
19th-century German women artists
People from Stralsund